Parkertown may refer to:

 Parkertown, Georgia
 Parkertown, New Jersey